Kho Orluk (died 1644) was an Oirat prince and Taish of the Torghut-Oirat tribe. Around 1616, Kho Orluk persuaded the other Torghut princes and lesser nobility to move their tribe en masse westward through southern Siberia and southward along the Emba River to the grass steppes north of the Russian garrison at Astrakhan. During the process of securing the steppes for his people, Kho Orluk met limited resistance from the local Muslim tribesman, therefore setting the foundation of what later became known as the Kalmyk Khanate.

In 1620 his daughter married Ishim-khan (son of Kuchum, Khan of Sibir).

References 

Kalmyk people
1644 deaths
Year of birth unknown